Lisa Malosky is a sports reporter based in Houston, Texas.  Over her career, she has covered the Houston Rockets of the National Basketball Association (NBA), Houston Comets of the Women's National Basketball Association (WNBA), and the Houston Cougars men's basketball contests. She came to Houston in 1991 working for KPRC-TV. Since that time, she has also covered the NBA and WNBA for NBC, and TNT/WTBS.

Malosky also served as co-host for the syndicated television program American Gladiators from 1993 to 1995.

Malosky began her television career as a news reporter at WXOW-TV in La Crosse, Wisconsin.

References

Living people
People from Houston
Women sports announcers
National Basketball Association broadcasters
American reporters and correspondents
Place of birth missing (living people)
Year of birth missing (living people)
College basketball announcers in the United States
Women's National Basketball Association announcers
American women television journalists
21st-century American women